Bhiwani railway station is located in Bhiwani district in the Indian state of Haryana.  It serves Bhiwani.

History
The Bathinda–Rewari metre-gauge line was converted to  broad gaugein 1994.

The Bhiwani–Rohtak link was laid in 1979.

Infrastructure
Now Bhiwani–Rewari line has expected to be double in 2016.

Amenities
The station has retiring rooms.

References

External links

Railway stations in Bhiwani district
Bikaner railway division
Railway stations in India opened in 1884
Railway junction stations in Haryana